Karazeyevo is a rural locality (a selo) in Medovskoye Rural Settlement, Bogucharsky District, Voronezh Oblast, Russia. The population was 78 as of 2010. There are 7 streets.

Geography 
Karazeyevo is located 44 km southeast of Boguchar (the district's administrative centre) by road. Yuzhny is the nearest rural locality.

References 

Rural localities in Bogucharsky District